The 1953 Barnsley by-election was a by-election held on 31 March 1953 for the British House of Commons constituency of Barnsley in the West Riding of Yorkshire.

The seat had become vacant on the resignation of the Labour Member of Parliament (MP) Sidney Schofield, who had represented the constituency since the 1951 general election.

The Labour candidate, Roy Mason, held the seat for his party with a slightly reduced majority. He went on to hold a series of cabinet posts in the Labour governments of the 1960s and 1970s.

Votes

See also
Barnsley (UK Parliament constituency)
1897 Barnsley by-election
1938 Barnsley by-election
2011 Barnsley Central by-election
List of United Kingdom by-elections

References 

By-elections to the Parliament of the United Kingdom in South Yorkshire constituencies
1953 in England
1953 elections in the United Kingdom
Elections in Barnsley
1950s in Yorkshire